General Sir Thomas Lionel Hunton,  (30 October 1885 – 21 April 1970) was a Royal Marines officer who served as the inaugural Commandant General Royal Marines from 1943 to 1946.

Early life
Hunton was born on 30 October 1885 in Bristol, Gloucestershire, the son on Theodore and Emma Maria Hunton.

Military career
Hunton joined Royal Marines in 1903 and served in the First World War before becoming Deputy Assistant Adjutant General of the Royal Marines in 1930 and Assistant Adjutant General of the Royal Marines in 1935. He served in the Second World War as Commander of the Portsmouth Division of the Royal Marines from 1938 and then as Adjutant General Royal Marines (and Commander of the Royal Marine Division) from 1941: it was under his guidance that the Royal Marines Division was broken up between July and September 1943 to provide six new Commandos. He was the first Commandant General Royal Marines from January 1943 until he retired in 1946.

Family life
Hunton married Margaret Mary France Steele on 8 September 1919 in Clifton, Bristol; they had a son and a daughter. He died on 21 April 1970 at Lympstone in Devon.

References

External links
Generals of World War II
Royal Marine Officers 1939−1945

1885 births
1970 deaths
Chevaliers of the Légion d'honneur
Knights Commander of the Order of the Bath
Knights of the Order of the Star of Romania
Members of the Royal Victorian Order
Officers of the Order of the British Empire
Military personnel from Bristol
Royal Marines generals of World War II
Royal Marines personnel of World War I
Royal Marines generals